Liberation Day is a day, often a public holiday, that marks the liberation of a place, similar to an independence day. Liberation marks the date of either a revolution, as in Cuba, the fall of a dictatorship, as in Portugal, or the end of an occupation by another state, as in the Netherlands, thereby differing from original independence day or creation of statehood.

List

See also
 National Day
 Revolution Day

References

Types of national holidays

January observances
February observances
March observances
April observances
May observances
June observances
July observances
August observances
October observances
November observances
December observances